Nur Mohammad (also Romanized as Nūr Moḩammad; also known as Deh-e Nūr Moḩammad-e Arghavānī) is a village in Jahanabad Rural District, in the Central District of Hirmand County, Sistan and Baluchestan Province, Iran. At the 2006 census, its population was 57, in 12 families.

References 

Populated places in Hirmand County